The Patagonian tyrant (Colorhamphus parvirostris) is a species of bird in the family Tyrannidae, the only one in the genus Colorhamphus. It is found in Argentina and Chile. Its natural habitat is temperate forests. Though it is a primarily insectivorous species, it has been seen also to eat the seeds of mayten and the fruit of leñadura.

References

External links
Patagonian tyrant in IBC (Internet Bird Collection.
Patagonian tyrant sounds in Xenocanto.

Monotypic genera
Patagonian tyrant
Birds of Chile
Birds of Patagonia
Birds of Tierra del Fuego
Patagonian tyrant
Taxa named by Charles Darwin
Taxonomy articles created by Polbot